The Festival Dancing in Your Head is a festival dedicated to commissioning, producing, and presenting new music and music films from around the world. The festival is produced by Headwaters Music, a non-profit music organization, led by composer Anthony Gatto. The  2005 festival at the Walker Art Center in Minneapolis celebrated the 75th birthday of Ornette Coleman with nearly 100 international musicians, including an evening with The Ornette Coleman Quartet. Past festival performers include the Kronos Quartet, Bang on a Can All-stars, So Percussion, Alarm Will Sound, Iva Bittová, Ethel, Flux Quartet, The Bad Plus, Happy Apple, Low, Gao Hong, Dean Granros and Antigravity, Tibetan Monks of the Gyuto Wheel of Dharma Monastery, Dosh, Patrick Crossland, Douglas Ewart, Anthony Cox. Composers performed include Steve Reich, David Lang, Michael Gordon, John Adams, Arvo Pärt, György Ligeti, Martin Bresnick, Brian Ferneyhough, Annie Gosfield, John King, Phil Kline, Evan Ziporyn, Béla Bartók.

Organization

Anthony Gatto is founder and artistic director.

External links
 The Festival Dancing in Your Head 2005: Ornette at 75
 The Festival Dancing in Your Head 2002
 The Festival Dancing in Your Head 2001
 Anthony Gatto's Personal webpage

Contemporary classical music festivals
Classical music festivals in the United States
Film festivals in Minnesota
Music festivals in Minnesota